The Jacob W. Van Winkle House is located in Lyndhurst, Bergen County, New Jersey, United States. The homestead was built in 1797 and is the current home of the Masonic Club of Lyndhurst. The homestead was added to the National Register of Historic Places on January 10, 1983.

History
The Van Winkle House is a large brown sandstone structure that was built in 1797. The house was used as a residence until 1921 when Masonic Club of Lyndhurst purchased it.

Jacob Van Winkle donated the land on which the River Road School was built in 1804.

See also

 National Register of Historic Places listings in Bergen County, New Jersey
 Jeremiah J. Yeareance House

References

Houses in Bergen County, New Jersey
Houses completed in 1797
Houses on the National Register of Historic Places in New Jersey
Lyndhurst, New Jersey
National Register of Historic Places in Bergen County, New Jersey
New Jersey Register of Historic Places
Stone houses in New Jersey